Catherine Margaret Shachaf is an Indian cell biologist. She previously held an instructor position at Stanford University School of Medicine, and has made ground-breaking discoveries in cancer research. Shachaf has spoken at scientific conferences and has published more than 17 journal articles. Her leading work was published in Nature (2004), "MYC Inactivation Uncovers Pluripotent Differentiation and Tumor Dormancy in Hepatocellular Cancer." Shachaf is on the Editorial Board of the International Journal of Green Nanotechnology.

Education

Post doctorate fellow: Stanford University, Medical Oncology 
Ph.D: Israel Institute of Technology, Molecular Medicine 
M.Sc: Israel Institute of Technology, Genetics 
B.Sc.: University of Haifa, Israel, Biology

Dr. Shachaf Technion PhD thesis http://www.graduate.technion.ac.il/Theses/Abstracts.asp?Id=10256

Honors and awards

FOCIS Trainee Satellite Symposia Award, FOCIS (2008)
AACR, Scholar in Training Award, Aflac (2008)
Young Scientist Clinical Award, FAMRI (2004–2009)
Comprehensive Cancer Center Translational Award, Stanford University (2005)
Richard W. Weiland Fellowship, CCIS, Stanford University (2001–2004)

Key scientific contributions
Shachaf has researched how MYC expression induces cancer in mice and the effect of its inactivation in those tumors.  She showed that removing MYC expression kills the tumor and that MYC reprograms the tumor cells.  When MYC expression is taken away from the tumor cells, they are released to their inherent embryonic program.  The appearance of the tissue formed in this process looks normal by histology (a method used by pathologists to determine the presence of cancer cells). However, Shachaf showed that the cells derived from the tumor are "camouflaged" to appear normal but have the capability to easily revert and become tumors.

The MYC protein in cancers correlates with poor prognosis and is a difficult therapeutic target.  To find alternative downstream targets of MYC, Shachaf defined levels of MYC expression required to drive tumorigenic properties.  She conducted a systematic genomic and proteomic profile of MYC dependent tumor cells using microarray analysis, mass spectrometry, cell-antibody arrays and phospho-flow (a flow cytometry based approach to study phosphorylation events in single cells).  As a member of the Stanford NCI funded Integrated Cancer Biology Program (ICBP), Shachaf and her colleagues developed a computational program of the genes and gene programs that are required to maintain cancers at different stages of aggressiveness.  Using this program, Shachaf and her team found the gene silencing and apoptotic programs to be most significant in inducing tumor cell death.

With preventative treatment of tumor-prone mice prior to developing tumors, Shachaf showed that it is possible to block tumor development.  This was achieved with a commonly used cholesterol lowering statin drug.  The statin inhibited signaling pathways required for the tumor generating activities of the MYC oncogene.  This study is an important demonstration in the efficacy of targeting tumors prior to onset.

Shachaf also leads the development of the use of Surface Enhanced Raman Spectroscopy nanoparticles for the detection of signaling events in single cancer cells.  RamanSpectroscopy relies on inelastic scattering, or Raman scattering, of monochromatic light, usually from a laser.  Photons of the laser light are absorbed by the nanoparticles and then reemitted.  The frequency of the reemitted photons is shifted up or down in comparison with original monochromatic frequency, called Raman scattering.  Spontaneous Raman scattering is typically very weak.  However, the Composite Organic-Inorganic Nanoparticles (COINs) used by Shachaf have enhanced Raman spectra.  Each particle has a different Raman tag generating a unique fingerprint Raman spectra.  This approach has tremendous advantages over the commonly used fluorescence tags.  Fluorescence has broad overlapping spectra making the use of multiple tags simultaneously difficult.  On the other hand, COINs have narrow peak spectra and therefore are more useful for multiple tag use.

References

External links
 Shachaf faculty homepage
 New imaging tool could improve cancer diagnosis
 Nanoparticles use Raman tags to highlight features within cells
 Harnessing Nanoparticles To Track Cancer Cell Changes
 Stanford Researchers Harness Nanoparticles To Track Cancer-Cell Changes

Israeli biologists
Swedish biologists
Stanford University School of Medicine faculty
Cell biologists
Living people
Science teachers
Technion – Israel Institute of Technology alumni
Israeli women scientists
University of Haifa alumni
Indian women biologists
Swedish women academics
Year of birth missing (living people)